Thomas Farnall (1874–1927), popularly known as Tot Farnall, was an English professional footballer who made 70 appearances in the Football League playing as a wing half for Small Heath and Bradford City. He played in Bradford City's first ever league game, in a 2–0 defeat at Grimsby Town, going on to play 25 games in the club's first season. He also played in the Southern League for Bristol Rovers and Watford.

Farnall was born and died in Birmingham.

References

1874 births
1927 deaths
Footballers from Birmingham, West Midlands
English footballers
Association football wing halves
Bristol Rovers F.C. players
Birmingham City F.C. players
Watford F.C. players
Bradford City A.F.C. players
Walsall F.C. players
Barrow A.F.C. players
Gloucester City A.F.C. players
English Football League players
Southern Football League players